Arch Grants is a Missouri non-profit corporation whose mission is to advance economic development through entrepreneurship.

History 
Founded in 2011, Arch Grants launched its international Business Plan Competition as a strategy to build the next generation of successful businesses within the St. Louis region. Five years ago, Missouri was ranked as the next-to-worst state in terms of its entrepreneurial activity  and as large corporations left St. Louis or merged with companies headquartered elsewhere in the wake of the recession, Arch Grants was founded to attract and retain high-growth companies to drive economic development efforts throughout the St. Louis region.

As of July 2014, Arch Grants has funded 55 companies that have generated $6.5 million in revenue, attracted $17.7 million in additional capital, and created 192 net new jobs for St. Louis. In addition, 98% of the companies in the business are still headquartered in St. Louis.

Arch Grants' unique model and success have drawn national media attention including The Wall Street Journal, Businessweek, Forbes, The Huffington Post, TechCrunch, and NPR as well as several local media channels including the Saint Louis Business Journal  and Saint Louis Magazine.

Key personnel 
Gabe Lozano, the founder of LockerDome, sits on the advisory board. Rex Sinquefield is a sponsor of the non-profit.

See also 
 Kranzberg Arts Foundation

References

External links
 

Entrepreneurship organizations
Non-profit corporations
Midtown St. Louis
Community building
Companies based in St. Louis
Organizations based in St. Louis
Non-profit organizations based in St. Louis